Samir Oraon is a BJP Leader. He is a Member Of Parliament Rajya Sabha From Jharkhand and National President BJP ST Morcha . On 23 March 2018 he got elected to the Rajya Sabha by getting 27 first preference votes out of 78.

References 

Bharatiya Janata Party politicians from Jharkhand
Living people
Year of birth missing (living people)